The A-League Men Golden Boot is an annual association football award presented to the leading goalscorer in the A-League Men. It is currently referred to as the Nike Golden Boot for sponsorship purposes.

The A-League was founded in 2005 to replace the semi-professional National Soccer League. The number of teams in the league has ranged from eight to twelve and there are currently twelve clubs in the league. The award is given to the top-scorer over the regular season (not including the finals series). The inaugural award was shared by four players: Alex Brosque, Bobby Despotovski, Stewart Petrie and Archie Thompson.

Jamie Maclaren has won the golden boot on four occasions, more than any other player. Petrie was the first non-Australian winner in the league's inaugural season.

Bobô – with 27 goals in 2017–18 – scored the most goals to win the Golden Boot, while Danny Allsopp scored the fewest to win the award outright, with 11 goals in 2006–07. The all-time record for lowest number of goals scored to be bestowed the award, however, is 8 goals; this was achieved during the 2005–06 season, when the award was shared between four players. This marks one of two seasons in which the award has been shared, the other being the 2016–17 season, where the award was shared between Jamie Maclaren and Besart Berisha. Bobô recorded the highest goals-to-games ratio to win the award, scoring 27 goals in 27 games in 2017–18 for a rate of 1.00.

Winners

Awards won by club

See also
A-League all-time records
W-League Golden Boot

Notes

References

General
Our history A-League.com.au (A-League). Retrieved 27 October 2014.

External links
 A-League official website

A-League Men trophies and awards
Australian soccer trophies and awards
Australia Men